Letona is a hamlet and concejo located in the municipality of Zigoitia, in Álava province, Basque Country, Spain. It is located 13km north-northwest of Vitoria-Gasteiz.

References

External links
 

Concejos in Zigoitia